The 1907 Navy Midshipmen football team represented the United States Naval Academy during the 1907 college football season. In their first and only season under Joseph M. Reeves, the Midshipmen compiled a 9–2–1 record, shut out eight opponents, and outscored all opponents by a combined score of 118 to 34. A. H. Douglas made Walter Camp's third-team All-America, the second Southerner ever to have done so.

Schedule

References

Navy
Navy Midshipmen football seasons
Navy Midshipmen football